Lisa Schultz Bressman is an American academic and lawyer. She has established herself as a scholar in administrative law and constitutional theory. Bressman joined Vanderbilt University Law School in 1998 after working in the Office of Legal Counsel in the Department of Justice and clerking for Supreme Court Justice Stephen Breyer and now-Second Circuit Judge José A. Cabranes. She teaches Administrative Law and Constitutional Law and is Co-Chair of the Regulatory Program.

See also 
 List of law clerks of the Supreme Court of the United States (Seat 2)

External links
 Vanderbilt Law School faculty profile

Law clerks of the Supreme Court of the United States
American legal scholars
Living people
Year of birth missing (living people)
Vanderbilt University Law School faculty